S. Petersen's Field Guide to Creatures of the Dreamlands is a supplement published by Chaosium in 1989 for the horror role-playing game Call of Cthulhu. It features creatures from the world of H.P. Lovecraft's Dream cycle stories.

Contents
S. Petersen's Field Guide to Creatures of the Dreamlands is a 64-page perfect-bound softcover book written by Sandy Petersen, with illustrations by Michael J. Ferrari. 

The book is a bestiary of creatures that inhabit the Dreamlands, the alternate reality featured in stories of H.P. Lovecraft such as The Dream-Quest of Unknown Kadath, Celephaïs, and The Cats of Ulthar.

Each entry features a full color print of each creature facing a description of the creature, a Lovecraft quote, a general outline, and three sub-entries consisting of habitat, distribution, and life and habits.

Reception
In the November 1989 edition of Games International (Issue 10), Mike Jarvis was ambivalent about this product. He admired the colour illustrations, which he called "quite beyond belief, with creatures ranging from the delicate and profoundly beautiful to the stark alien horror more usually associated with H. P. Lovecraft's writing [...] they are truly something special." However, Jarvis questioned the utility of this book, saying "this is of very little use in a Call of Cthulhu campaign." He concluded by giving the book an average rating of 3 out of 5, commenting, "While this is an excellent product with no faults whatsoever, ultimately [it is] merely a book for Lovecaft collectors and Call of Cthulhu completists."  

In the March-April 1990 edition of Space Gamer/Fantasy Gamer (No. 88), a reviewer commented that "if you are really into this genre, gaming or otherwise, put this review down and go buy Dreamlands. If you only have a passing interest, you could certainly do worse."

In the June 1990 edition of Dragon (Issue 158), Jim Bambra called this book "slickly produced and beautifully illustrated... Best of all are the illustrations by Mark J. Frerrari, which are nothing short of excellent." He concluded with a strong recommendation, saying, "S. Petersen's Field Guide to Creatures of the Dreamlands is a book that anyone who likes excellent artwork should have in their collection. The full-page plates are superb. They are also useful for showing to players as their Investigators encounter these creatures."

Awards
At the 1990 Origins Awards, Creatures of the Dreamlands was named "Best Roleplaying Supplement of 1989" and "Best Graphic Presentation of a Roleplaying Game, Adventure, or Supplement of 1989 ".

See also 

 H.P. Lovecraft's Dreamlands

References

Call of Cthulhu (role-playing game) supplements
Origins Award winners
Role-playing game supplements introduced in 1989